Med i mleko (translation: "Honey and Milk") is the first solo album from Aleksandra Kovač, a Serbian R&B performer. It was released in Serbia and Europe in spring 2006.

Her first single reached #2 on MTV Adria Top 20 (beaten by Gnarls Barkley'S "Crazy"). Her second single, "C'mon Boy" reached #11 on MTV Adria Top 20. However, her third single from the album, "Nemoj ovako", didn't reach the charts. The third single has been released in January 2007. 
None of the 3 singles were released as CD singles, but only like videos.

Track list 
 "Intro" — 0:39
 "Ti" — 3:55
 "C'mon Boy" — 3:16
 "Lutrija" — 3:22
 "Nije nam vreme" — 5:29
 "Da te volim" — 3:21
 "A.K.'s Black Balls" — 3:37
 "Love Operator" — 3:33
 "Nemoj ovako" — 4:52
 "Ovde ti je dom" — 4:19

References

External links 
 Official Website of Aleksandra Kovač
 On: www.discogs.com

2006 debut albums
Aleksandra Kovač albums
Komuna (company) albums